This is a list of yearly Texas Conference football standings.

Texas Conference football standings

References

Standings
Texas Conference football